Randell Alphonso Williams (born 30 December 1996) is an English professional footballer who plays as a full-back and winger for EFL League One club Bolton Wanderers.

Career

Early career
After spending time with the Tottenham Hotspur academy and playing non-league football for Tower Hamlets, Williams signed for Crystal Palace in January 2016. He had been on trial with the club in December 2015. Williams was released by Palace at the end of the 2016–17 season; in July 2017 he signed for Watford. He moved on loan to Wycombe Wanderers in January 2018. He made his professional debut on 2 April 2018, in a league game against Grimsby Town, and was praised by Wycombe manager Gareth Ainsworth for his performance. He returned to Wycombe in July 2018 for a second loan spell, which ended on 1 January 2019.

Exeter City
He moved to Exeter City on a free transfer on 18 January 2019. He scored his first goal for Exeter in the 4–0 derby victory against local rivals Plymouth Argyle. Williams ended the 2019–20 season with 5 goals and 14 assists, and was awarded Player of the Season and Goal of the Season by the club.

He was offered a new contract by Exeter on 12 May 2021, with the club saying they expected him to leave.

Hull City
On 17 June 2021 it was announced that he would sign for Hull City on a free transfer on 1 July 2021. He made his debut for Hull on 14 August 2021 when he came on as a 73rd minute substitute for Richie Smallwood in the 3–0 loss to Queens Park Rangers.

Bolton Wanderers 
On 5 January 2023, Williams joined Bolton Wanderers for an undisclosed fee, signing a two-and-a-half-year deal with the club.

Career statistics

Honours
Individual
PFA Team of the Year: 2019–20 League Two
Exeter City Player of the Season: 2019–20

References

1996 births
Living people
English footballers
Association football fullbacks
Association football wingers
Tottenham Hotspur F.C. players
Tower Hamlets F.C. players
Crystal Palace F.C. players
Watford F.C. players
Wycombe Wanderers F.C. players
Exeter City F.C. players
Hull City A.F.C. players
Bolton Wanderers F.C. players
English Football League players